The Igreja do Santo Cristo do Outeiro is a National monument of Portugal. It is located in Bragança, in the parish of Outeiro.

References

National monuments in Bragança District
Churches in Bragança District
Basilica churches in Portugal